The 2022 UCI BMX World Championships was held from 26 to 31 July 2022   in Nantes, France.

Medal summary

Elite events

U23 events

Junior events

Medal table

References

UCI BMX World Championships
BMX Championships
BMX
UCI BMX World Championships
UCI